Necessary Roughness may refer to:
 Necessary Roughness (film) (1991), a sports comedy film directed by Stan Dragoti
 Necessary Roughness (book) (1996), by author Marie G. Lee
 Necessary Roughness (album) (1997), released by The Lady of Rage
 Necessary Roughness (TV series) (2011), a USA Network show starring Callie Thorne